Lovina Onyegbule is a Nigerian athlete.

Onyegbule has a visual impairment and competes in T11 and F11 class races. She studied communications at Our Saviour Institute of Science and Technology.

She competed at the 2015 African Games, where she won gold medals in the 100m T11 and 200m T11 events, and at the 2016 Paralympics.

References

Year of birth missing (living people)
Living people
Athletes (track and field) at the 2016 Summer Paralympics
Paralympic athletes of Nigeria
African Games medalists in athletics (track and field)
Athletes (track and field) at the 2015 African Games
African Games gold medalists for Nigeria
Nigerian female sprinters
21st-century Nigerian women